Skraeling Island lies off the east coast of Ellesmere Island in the Canadian territory of Nunavut, at the mouth of Alexandra Fiord. Buchanan Bay lies to its north-east.

History
The Norse referred to the indigenous peoples they encountered in Greenland and the New World as skræling. According to the ancient sagas, the Norse considered the natives hostile because they were repeatedly attacked by them.

Archaeology
Skraeling Island is an extensive archeological site which has yielded a wealth of artifacts from Small-Tool cultures dating from 4500 BC (Dorset and Thule). Norse items found at Inuit sites — some 80 objects from a single site including a small driftwood carving of a face with European features — suggests that there was a lively trade between the groups (as well as an exchange of Norse goods among the Inuit).

References

External links
 Skraeling Island  in the Atlas of Canada - Toporama; Natural Resources Canada

Islands of the Queen Elizabeth Islands
Uninhabited islands of Qikiqtaaluk Region
Viking Age in Canada